Cassiar was a provincial electoral district in the Canadian province of British Columbia.  It first appeared in the British Columbia general election of 1882.

Demographics

Electoral history 
Note: Winners in each election are in bold.

|-

|- bgcolor="white"
!align="right" colspan=3|Total valid votes
!align="right"|57
!align="right"|100.00%
!align="right"|
|- bgcolor="white"
!align="right" colspan=3|Total rejected ballots
!align="right"|
!align="right"|
!align="right"|
|- bgcolor="white"
!align="right" colspan=3|Turnout
!align="right"|%
!align="right"|
!align="right"|
|}

|-

|- bgcolor="white"
!align="right" colspan=3|Total valid votes
!align="right"|
!align="right"|100.00%
!align="right"|
|- bgcolor="white"
!align="right" colspan=3|Total rejected ballots
!align="right"|
!align="right"|
!align="right"|
|- bgcolor="white"
!align="right" colspan=3|Turnout
!align="right"|%
!align="right"|
!align="right"|
|- bgcolor="white"
!align="right" colspan=7|1  "No strictly accurate return available - the Returning Officer merely stating: 'John Grant elected by a majority of 3'." 
|}

|-

|- bgcolor="white"
!align="right" colspan=3|Total valid votes
!align="right"|108
!align="right"|100.00%
!align="right"|
|- bgcolor="white"
!align="right" colspan=3|Total rejected ballots
!align="right"|
!align="right"|
!align="right"|
|- bgcolor="white"
!align="right" colspan=3|Turnout
!align="right"|%
!align="right"|
!align="right"|
|}

|-

|Independent (Government?)
|William Dalby 
|align="right"|45 	
|align="right"|30.61%
|align="right"|
|align="right"|unknown

|- bgcolor="white"
!align="right" colspan=3|Total valid votes
!align="right"|147
!align="right"|100.00%
!align="right"|
|- bgcolor="white"
!align="right" colspan=3|Total rejected ballots
!align="right"|
!align="right"|
!align="right"|
|- bgcolor="white"
!align="right" colspan=3|Turnout
!align="right"|%
!align="right"|
!align="right"|
|}

|-

|Independents
|George Simpson McTavish
|align="right"|45
|align="right"|14.15%
|align="right"|
|align="right"|unknown
|- bgcolor="white"
!align="right" colspan=3|Total valid votes
!align="right"|318
!align="right"|100.00%
!align="right"|
|- bgcolor="white"
!align="right" colspan=3|Total rejected ballots
!align="right"|
!align="right"|
!align="right"|
|- bgcolor="white"
!align="right" colspan=3|Turnout
!align="right"|%
!align="right"|
!align="right"|
|- bgcolor="white"
!align="right" colspan=7|2 Increased to a two-member seat from one.
|}

Cassiar riding was eliminated in the redistribution after the 1900 election.  In the 1903 election, this region was represented by the new Atlin and Skeena ridings.

Sources 
Elections BC historical returns

Electoral district
Former provincial electoral districts of British Columbia